The Smith & Wesson Bodyguard is a family of small J-frame revolvers with shrouded hammers manufactured by Smith & Wesson. They are available chambered in either .38 Special or .357 Magnum.

Models

Model 38
The Model 38 is aluminum-framed, has a carbon steel barrel, a carbon steel cylinder with a five-round capacity, and is chambered in .38 Special.

Model 49 
The Model 49 is an all-carbon-steel-framed revolver chambered in .38 Special.

Model 638 
The Model 638 is aluminum-framed with stainless steel cylinder and barrel. Chambered in .38 Special.

Model 649 
The Model 649 is an all stainless-steel framed revolver. Chambered in .357 Magnum or .38 Special.

M&P Bodyguard 38

The M&P Bodyguard 38, introduced in 2014, is the latest incarnation of a Smith & Wesson revolver using the Bodyguard name. It is a polymer framed revolver chambered in .38 Special, and is available with a Crimson Trace laser sight integrated in to the grip. Like previous Bodyguard models, it has a five-round cylinder and a concealed hammer but unlike the previous models, the hammer cannot be cocked for single action fire.   The lockwork is different than any other Smith & Wesson revolver and the model has no parts interchangeable with the J-frame series. Chambered in .38 Special, it is available with a Crimson Trace (previously Insight) red-dot laser sight integrated in to the grip.  name. In 2018, S&W announced a new version of the Bodyguard which lacks the integrated laser sight.
It  is most closely related to the Centennial models.

History

Users
 Clyde A. Tolson, special assistant to FBI chief J. Edgar Hoover, owned a Model 38 Airweight, serial number 512236, with his name engraved on the side.

 Nguyễn Ngọc Loan, South Vietnam's chief of National Police, was photographed using a Model 49 Bodyguard to execute a Viet Cong prisoner, Nguyễn Văn Lém, during the Tet Offensive of 1968. 

Bernhard Goetz used a Model 38 Bodyguard in the controversial 1984 New York City Subway shooting.

Fictional
 John D. MacDonald's fictional character, Travis McGee, uses an Airweight Bodyguard in Darker than Amber and other novels.
 Harry Angel, a character played by Mickey Rourke uses an Airweight Bodyguard in the film Angel Heart.
 Claire Redfield in Resident Evil 2 uses a S&W Bodyguard as her starting pistol. 
 Ricardo Tubbs carries and uses a stainless or nickel-plated Bodyguard model in many episodes of Miami Vice.
 Ernst Stavro Blofeld played by Charles Gray points a blued S&W Bodyguard at James Bond in the 1971 film Diamonds Are Forever.

See also 
 Smith & Wesson Bodyguard 380
 Smith & Wesson Centennial
 Smith & Wesson Model 36

References

External links
 User Manual

Revolvers of the United States
Smith & Wesson revolvers
Police weapons
.357 Magnum firearms
.38 Special firearms